Hydroxydopamine may refer to:

 2-Hydroxydopamine
 
 6-Hydroxydopamine (oxidopamine)